ThunderCats is an American animated cartoon series created by Rankin/Bass Productions.

Season 1 comprises 65 episodes - a standard number for animated series at the time, as it allowed the series to be shown every weekday for thirteen weeks (one full broadcast season). The series' two-part pilot episode debuted starting January 23, 1985, with airdates varying by market; WTOG aired it on January 23, while WNEW aired it on February 1. The series subsequently began airing in its regular weekday time slot on September 9. In 1986, the series returned for a TV movie, ThunderCats - Ho!, which was subsequently aired as five separate episodes worked into the continuing rerun rotation of Season 1. The second season, which produced sixty episodes, was broadcast as three seasons between 1987 and 1989. Each broadcast season began with a five-part miniseries that established the new concepts and characters that would play into the events of the season that followed. Most online episode guides for the series list the episodes in two seasons as they were originally produced.

The entire series has been released on DVD, collecting both seasons across two box-sets. Season 1, Volume 1 was recalled when it was discovered that the second episode was missing its background musical score, and a corrected version was released in its place. Volume 1 was released on August 9, 2005 and Volume 2 on December 6, 2005.

The list below presents the episodes in their original broadcast order, which is also the order used for the DVD release of the series. However, neither this order nor the original production order of the episodes is the correct chronological story order for the series. Although there is little in the way of major continuing storylines running through ThunderCats, certain creatures reoccur and clips from other episodes are employed. At times, the order used below causes these to be presented out of order. This is only a problem in the second half of season 1, and especially affects the five episodes which comprise the mini-series Lion-O's Anointment, which are split up throughout the latter half of the season, when the stories featured are supposed to occur on consecutive days. Re-airing on the Cartoon Network years later, the series was presented in a slightly altered, more chronological order with Lion-O's Anointment shown in consecutive order.

Series overview

Season 1 (1985)

Season 2 (1986–87) 
Note: ThunderCats Ho! and Mumm-Ra Lives! were originally broadcast as stand-alone TV movies.

Season 3 (1988)

Season 4 (1989)

Notes

References 
 Lists at purrsiathunder.org Retrieved February 3, 2006
 Cartoon Network order
 Production codes
 List at epguides.com

External links 
 List at shipunderground.com

ThunderCats episodes, List of
Episodes